The men's 4 x 100 metres relay at the 2017 World Championships in Athletics was held at the United kingdom,London Olympic Stadium on 12 August.

Summary

As the final was billed as Usain Bolt's final race, many eyes were on the Jamaican team, which put their hurdle gold medalist Omar McLeod on leadoff. Their main challenger was expected to be USA which put their 2015 anchor, Mike Rodgers on leadoff, and scheduled the fastest starter in the championships, Christian Coleman to run against Bolt on anchor. Earlier in the day, Bolt did anchor the team to qualify, minus McLeod.

Out of the blocks, USA and Jamaica were out about even, making up the stagger on Stuart Dutamby for France to their outside. Great Britain with Chijindu Ujah and on the far outside, Shuhei Tada for Japan were also out with them. A good British handoff to Adam Gemili  had them passing China on their outside, while USA's 100 metre champion Justin Gatlin gained a step on Julian Forte for Jamaica. Into the third leg around the turn, USA's Jaylen Bacon maintained the lead against Jamaica's Yohan Blake, with Britain's Danny Talbot  also ahead of Jamaica. Britain made a smooth blind handoff to Nethaneel Mitchell-Blake while Coleman took the baton off Bacon, Britain leaving the zone with a slight advantage, while Bolt had two metres to make up for Jamaica. Such a gain was expected to be within Bolt's ability but four steps into the straightaway, Bolt flinched in pain, hopping then somersaulting to the track. Mitchell-Blake and Coleman raced almost even until the last 20 metres when Mitchell-Blake pulled ahead and dipped at the finish line for an unexpected British win on home soil. 8 metres back, Japan came home with bronze, backing up their Olympic silver.

Medical aid with a wheelchair and his Jamaican teammates surrounded Bolt on the ground. While the British men's and women's relay teams celebrated together, Bolt lay on the ground in pain for a couple of minutes then refused the wheelchair and was helped to his feet by his teammates. With them by his side he limped across the finish line for the final time then went back to the ground wincing in pain. 100 Metre Champion Justin Gatlin blamed Bolt's injury on the poor planning and the teams being sent out forty-five minutes late.

During the final, the Chinese third leg runner Su Bingtian was accidentally hit on the head by Britain's second leg runner Adam Gemili as the former started his run. The Chinese side later decided not to make a post-race appeal and thus no further action was taken.

Records
Before the competition records were as follows:

The following records were set at the competition:

Qualification criteria
The first eight placed teams at the 2017 IAAF World Relays and the host country qualify automatically for entry with remaining places being filled by teams with the fastest performances during the qualification period.

Schedule
The event schedule, in local time (UTC+1), is as follows:

Results

Heats

The first round took place on 12 August in two heats as follows:

The first three in each heat ( Q ) and the next two fastest ( q ) qualified for the final. The overall results were as follows:

Final
The final took place on 12 August at 22:01. The results were as follows (photo finish):

References

relay
Relays at the World Athletics Championships